Rifai or Rifai Nuts is a Lebanese multinational nut-retailing company headquartered in Beirut, Lebanon. It is the largest nut-retailing chain in the Middle East and the company with the biggest market share in Lebanon.

Rifai was founded in Beirut in 1948 as a home-based operation supplying roasted nuts and coffee to the local neighborhood. In addition to its retail brand, Rifai wholesales nuts under other brands.

History
Rifai began on Mazraa street in Beirut in 1948 offering home-roasted nuts and kernels to the Lebanese.

Rifai's offers locally produced products in a variety of flavors. Its factory employs over 200 employees

In 2021, MERIT, the holding company of the Saadé family, completed the acquisition of Rifai in a bid to accelerate the brand's growth and expand worldwide.

References

External links
official website - Lebanon
e-commerce store - international

Food and drink companies of Lebanon
Companies based in Beirut
1948 establishments in Lebanon
Retail companies established in 1948
Lebanese brands